Tadej Žagar-Knez (born 12 August 1991) is a Slovenian football midfielder who plays for FC Großklein.

Career
After two years in Austria with SAK Klagenfurt, where he also won the 2015–16 player of the season in the Kärntner Liga, Žagar-Knez moved back to Slovenia and joined NK Nafta 1903. A half year later, he returned to SAK Klagenfurt. After six months, he joined Austria Klagenfurt.

In summer 2018, he joined TuS Bad Gleichenberg. In February 2019, he joined NK Bravo. In summer 2019, he returned to Austria and joined FC Großklein.

References

External links
 
 Tadej Žagar-Knez at FC Großklein's website

1991 births
Living people
Slovenian footballers
Slovenian expatriate footballers
Association football midfielders
NK Šampion players
NK Aluminij players
NK Celje players
NK Nafta Lendava players
NK Bravo players
Slovenian Second League players
Slovenian PrvaLiga players
Austrian Regionalliga players
Slovenian expatriate sportspeople in Austria
Expatriate footballers in Austria